Newhall is an unincorporated community in McDowell County, West Virginia, United States. Newhall has a post office with ZIP code 24866.

References

Unincorporated communities in McDowell County, West Virginia
Unincorporated communities in West Virginia
Coal towns in West Virginia